David Taghinejad (born 15 April 1985), known professionally as David Tag, is a Persian British actor. He is known for portraying the role of Sylver McQueen in the Channel 4 soap opera Hollyoaks from June 2018 until January 2022.

Career
Tag studied at the Manchester School of Acting between 2012 and 2017, during which time he made his acting debut in an episode of the Channel 4 soap opera Hollyoaks as PSCO Rocco. After graduating in 2017, he appeared as Darryl in an episode of the ITV soap opera Emmerdale, a customer in the Woolpack.

In 2018, Tag returned to Hollyoaks and was cast in the regular role of Sylver McQueen. He was introduced as the brother of established character Goldie McQueen (Chelsee Healey) and the son of Breda McQueen (Moya Brady). The character's storylines in the soap included the discovery that he was adopted and that his adoptive mother Breda was a serial killer had killed his biological father and his stepfather, which ultimately resulted in Sylver killing her in self defence, his marriage to Mercedes McQueen (Jennifer Metcalfe) and the revelation that he was the father of Cher Winters (Bethannie Hare). Tag left the soap in January 2022 and the character was killed off after being left to die by his stepson Bobby Costello (Jayden Fox).

In 2020, Tag portrayed Thomas in the LGBTQ+ themed short film S.A.M. alongside Sam Retford and George Webster. In 2021, he appeared alongside Retford again in the short film White Wedding, in which he played the role of a vampire prince. From December 2021 to January 2022, he played the Ringleader in the pantomime Goldilocks and the Three Bears at St Helens Theatre Royal and is set to reprise the role at Epstein Theatre between December 2022 and January 2023. In 2022, he starred as Ted in the short film Hello, Death and as Mr J. in the documentary Dark Phones. He also appeared in an episode of Meet the Richardsons and was a contestant on Pointless Celebrities alongside fellow Hollyoaks actress Jazmine Franks.

Personal life
Since 2019, Tag has been in a relationship with beauty therapist Abi Harrison. They announced the birth of their son in June 2021.

Filmography

Stage

References

External links
 

1985 births
21st-century English actors
English soap opera actors
English television actors
Living people
Male actors from Greater Manchester
Actors from Stockport